The European Wildwater Championships are an international event in canoeing organized by the European Canoe Association. The European Championships take place every two year from 1997.

Editions

Individual results
This is the list of the individual podium of the main twelve events classic and sprint (C1 and C2 men and women, K1 men and women).

Classic

K1 men

C1 men

C2 men

K1 women

C1 women

C2 women

Sprint

K1 men

C1 men

C2 men

K1 women

C1 women

C2 women

See also
 Wildwater canoeing
 European Canoe Slalom Championships
 Wildwater World Championships

References

External links
 

 
Recurring sporting events established in 1997